Roscidotoga sapphiripes is a moth of the family Nepticulidae. It is found along the north-eastern coast of Queensland.

The larvae feed on Elaeocarpus obovatus. They mine the leaves of their host plant.

External links
Australian Faunal Directory

Moths of Australia
Nepticulidae
Moths described in 2000